Sasha Gollish (born December 27, 1981) is a Canadian competitive runner. She won a gold medal in the half-marathon at the 2013 Maccabiah Games in Israel, a bronze medal in the 1500 m at the 2015 Pan American Games, and gold medals at the 2017 Maccabiah Games in the 800m, 1,500m, and 5,000m events. She won the 2016 Canadian women's 10K Cross Country Championship, the 2017 women's 8K North American, Central American and Caribbean Athletic Association (NACAC) Cross-Country Championship, and the 2018 Canadian Half Marathon National Championship. In 2022, Gollish set a new women’s 40+ indoor mile world record, and that same year she won the gold medal at the 2022 NACAC Half Marathon Championships

Early and personal life
Gollish was born in Toronto, Ontario, Canada, to Dr. Jeffrey Gollish and Dr. Patricia Houston. She has two younger siblings, Tara and Joey.

For high school Gollish attended York Mills Collegiate Institute. She has a B.A. in Economics (University of Toronto), a Bachelor of Engineering (University of Western Ontario), a Masters of Engineering (U of T), and a PhD in Civil Engineering Education (U of T), in studying for which she researched the best way to teach engineering students to use math.

She works as an engineering consultant. Gollish is a civil engineer, with a focus on road safety. She is also a competitive cyclist, duathlete, triathlete, and ultimate frisbee player.

Running career

2010-15
Gollish began running seriously at 30 years of age. She has run for the University of Toronto Varsity Blues.

She won the half-marathon at the 2013 Maccabiah Games. Gollish won the 2013  Sporting Life 10K in Toronto with a time of 35:58.

Gollish finished fifth in the 1500m at the 2014 Canadian Track and Field Championships. She won the Sporting Life 10K in Toronto with a time of 34:19.

At the 2015 Pan American Games, competing for Team Canada, Gollish won a bronze medal in the Women's 1500m with a time of 4:10.11. She was named 2015 Canadian Interuniversity Sport (CIS) Female Athlete of the Year (track events) for her performance at the CIS Championships, winning three gold medals in the 1000m, 3000m, and 4 × 800 m relay events and two silver medals in the 600m and 1500m events, the most individual medals ever won by a distance athlete. She was also named MVP of the 2015 Ontario University Athletics (OUA) Championships after winning three individual gold medals in the 600m, 1500m, and 3000m events. In November 2015 she was named one of the Top 8 Academic All-Canadians by Canadian Interuniversity Sport. In December 2015 she won the silver medal in the San Antonio Rock ‘n Roll Half Marathon.

2016-20
In March 2016, Gollish won a silver medal in the senior 10K with a 37:53 run at the 2016 Pan American Cross Country Cup. In November 2016 she won the CNO Financial Indianapolis Monumental Half-Marathon with a time of 1:11:07, setting a new course record. Later that month Gollish won the senior women's 10K at the Canadian Cross Country Championships in Kingston, Ontario, at Fort Henry. 

In March 2017, Gollish won the senior women's 8K with a time of 26:48 at the North America, Central America and Caribbean Athletic Association (NACAC) Cross-Country Championships in Boca Raton, Florida. In June 2017 she won the women's 5000m in 15:24.12 at the Stumptown Twilight track meet at Lewis & Clark College.
 	
In July 2017 she came in third in the women’s 5,000m at 15:42 at the Canadian Track and Field Championships in Ottawa. In 2017 Gollish also set the Canadian 35+ masters 1,500m record with a time of 4:07.70, and the Canadian 35+ 5000m record with a time of 15:24.12. 

Gollish won gold medals in the 800m, 1,500m (in 4:18.41), and 5,000m events at the 2017 Maccabiah Games, and received the Female Athlete of the Games award from Israeli supermodel closing event host Bar Refaeli.
 	
In May 2018, she won the Canadian National Championship in the Half Marathon in Calgary, Canada, with a time of 1:14:19.

On July 11, 2018, Gollish completed the marathon distance in a training run in a respectable 3:18:48. Her debut marathon was in Berlin in September of the same year. Unfortunately, at 31 kilometres she was forced to DNF after the honking of a blocked pace car behind her caused her to go into an anaerobic state, leading to her cramping severely, walking, and then falling down. She was dragged off the course in full-body rigour by paramedics and brought to the hospital. After the incident, she said said: "I wanted to quit racing. I’m an engineer, I have a Ph.D., why am I doing this?" But after a few days she realized that she was too in love with running to stop.

2021-present
In 2021 Gollish set the W35 Canadian national record in the mile at age of 39, with a time of 4:23.17.

On February 27, 2022, Gollish set a new women’s 40+ indoor mile world record of 4:38.73, breaking the decade-old record by six seconds, at the Ontario Masters Championships in Toronto.

In June 2022, Gollish broke the previous women’s Canadian 40+ 1,500m record by seven seconds in a time of 4:16.46  at the La Classique d’athlétisme de Montréal. In 2022 she also won two national championship medals, in the 10,000m (silver) and road 10K (bronze), and the gold medal at the 2022 NACAC Half Marathon Championships in San Jose, Costa Rica in mid-May.

In September 2022 she won the women’s vertical climb at the Canadian Mountain & Trail Running Championships in Vernon, British Columbia.

See also
List of Maccabiah records in athletics
List of Pan American Games medalists in athletics (women)

References

External links
IAAF profile
All-Athletics profile
Twitter page
Sasha Gollish website
"Episode #268: Faster as a Master with Sasha Gollish," Running Rogue, March 11, 2022.

1981 births
21st-century Canadian Jews
Living people
Athletes from Toronto
Athletes (track and field) at the 2015 Pan American Games
Canadian civil engineers
Canadian female cross country runners
Canadian female long-distance runners
Canadian female marathon runners
Canadian female middle-distance runners
Canadian female steeplechase runners
Canadian masters athletes
Canadian Track and Field Championships winners
Jewish Canadian sportspeople
Jewish female athletes (track and field)
Maccabiah Games medalists in athletics
Maccabiah Games gold medalists for Canada
Competitors at the 2013 Maccabiah Games
Competitors at the 2017 Maccabiah Games
Pan American Games bronze medalists for Canada
Pan American Games track and field athletes for Canada
Pan American Games medalists in athletics (track and field)
Toronto Varsity Blues players
University of Toronto alumni
University of Western Ontario alumni
Medalists at the 2015 Pan American Games